Sadovyi is a Ukrainian surname. Notable people with the surname include:

 Andriy Sadovyi (born 1968), Ukrainian politician
 Denys Sadovyi (born 1995), Ukrainian footballer
 Yevgeny Sadovyi (born 1973), Russian swimmer

See also
 

Ukrainian-language surnames